Federal Diet may refer to:

The Bundestag, the current legislative body in Germany
The Federal Convention, the only central institution of the German Confederation from 1815 to 1848
The Tagsatzung,  the legislative and executive council of the Old Swiss Confederacy